Gregory Joseph Slavonic is an American government official and retired U.S. Navy officer. He has served as Acting Under Secretary of the Navy from April 24, 2020 to January 20, 2021. He served as the 18th United States Assistant Secretary of the Navy for Manpower and Reserve Affairs (ASN M&RA) from June 11, 2018 to January 20, 2021. Secretary Slavonic retired as a one-star rear admiral serving 34 years in the United States Navy and the Navy Reserve.

Early life, Education and Military career

Slavonic was born in Great Bend, KS and raised in a Roman Catholic family in Oklahoma City, OK. He attended Christ the King Catholic Grade School and graduated from John Carroll Catholic Grade School in Oklahoma City and then attended and graduated from Bishop McGuinness High School in Oklahoma City. Following high school, he attended Oklahoma State University and later graduated with Bachelor of Science degree in Journalism & Broadcasting. Slavonic enlisted the United States Navy in 1971 during the Vietnam War, and following his recruit training at Navy Training Center at Great Lakes, Illinois, he was ordered to the Navy Signalman "A" school at Newport, Rhode Island. Upon course completion he was then attached to aircraft carrier USS Constellation and participated in two western Pacific deployments in support of combat operations in Vietnam.

The Constellation participated in the North Vietnam Easter Offensive in the early spring of 1972. President Richard Nixon signed an executive order (Operation Linebacker) to Task Force 77 authorizing aerial mining North Vietnamese Haiphong Harbor and supporting U.S.  ground troops. Constellation airwing carried out extensive air strikes into North Vietnamese targets on May 10, 1972.  During this operation the aircrew from Fighter Squadron VF-96 “Fighting Falcons” – LT Randy Cunningham and LTJG William Driscoll became the Vietnam War’s first “Aces”.   The Constellation soon returned to San Diego and was awarded the Presidential Unit Citation by President Richard Nixon for her deployment.

Upon his return from sea duties, Slavonic was discharged from active service and entered the United States Navy Reserve in Oklahoma City where he earned a commission as an Ensign. He attended the University of Central Oklahoma and graduated in summer 1976 with Master's degree in Education. He rose through the ranks of the Navy Reserve and was recalled to active service in November 1990 for the Gulf War. Then Commander Slavonic was assigned to the staff of U.S. Central Command under General Norman Schwarzkopf Jr. and assumed duty with the Navy public affairs section, Joint Information Bureau in Dhahran, Saudi Arabia.

He then served as a Chief of Navy News desk and combat media escort officer, which included leading media Combat Correspondent Pools (CCP) pools aboard the guided-missile frigate USS Curts documenting the processing and interrogation of more than 40 Iraqi prisoners of war and floating Iraqi mines which posed danger to U.S. and international shipping. In addition he led a media pool to the 18,000-ton amphibious assault ship USS Tripoli in the Persian Gulf where the next day the ship when struck an Iraqi underwater tethered mine.

Slavonic later reached the rank of rear admiral (lower half) and was recalled to active duty in June 2004 in order to take part in the Operation Noble Eagle and Operation Enduring Freedom, Baghdad, Iraq. He was the first U.S. Navy flag officer assigned to the Multinational Force Iraq (MNF-I) staff and also served as the director of strategic communications and public affairs officer for Army Commanding General of Multinational Force-Iraq (MNF-I)

While in Iraq, Slavonic coordinated and executed the largest media event for the newly formed MNF-I command on July 1, 2004. It was the first court appearance of former Iraqi president Saddam Hussein since his capture December 13, 2003. This media event would be seen world-wide. Also arraigned in court that day were eleven members of Saddam's cabinet (several on Iraq's "most wanted list") Abid Hamid Malmud al-Tikriti, Ali Hasan al-Majid al-Tikriti (Chemical Ali), Aziz Saleh al-Numan, Mohamed Hamza al-Zubaydi, Tariq Aziz, and Saddam's two half brothers Barzan Ibrahim Hasan al-Tikriti and Watban Ibrahim Hasan al-Tikriti. The six-hour court arraignment would be the last time all twelve men would ever be together again. Slavonic also served as the Director, Combined Press Information Center. He retired from the Navy/Navy Reserve in June 2005.

Private sector
Slavonic held several leadership positions in both the newspaper and television industry prior to joining the Computer Sciences Corporation, supporting the U.S. Navy's outreach program. Slavonic also served as President, FlagBridge Strategic Communications for more than six years. He also was invited to be a minority owner/investor in the Oklahoma City CAVALRY professional basketball team which was the first pro basketball team in Oklahoma City.  The CAVALRY was a member of the Continental Basketball Association (CBA) from 1990 to 1997.  In 1997 the team won the CBA championship beating the Florida BEACHDOGS in a seven-games series 4-2.  In addition, he was Executive Director of the Jim Thorpe Association and the Oklahoma Sports Hall of Fame.  The Jim Thorpe Association presents annually the Jim Thorpe Award to the "Outstanding Defensive Back" in Division-I NCAA college football. He was also a university adjunct professor teaching courses in Leadership, Public Relations and Mass Communications.

He has also been recognized with the Distinguished Alumnus Award from Oklahoma State University (College of Arts & Science), University of Central Oklahoma and Bishop McGuinness High School.

Public sector
Slavonic served for three and half years as the first Chief of Staff to United States Senator James Lankford of Oklahoma. In this role, Slavonic was responsible for building and organizing a senate staff including hiring, establishing processes and procedures for new Washington D.C. office, and two state offices located in Oklahoma City and Tulsa.

Books authored
 The Jim Thorpe Award – The First 20 Years (with Bob Burke) (2007)
 Leadership in Action (2010)
 Profiles in Patriotic Leadership (2012)

Awards and decorations

References

1949 births
Kansas Republicans
Living people
Oklahoma State University alumni
Trump administration personnel
United States Assistant Secretaries of the Navy
United States Department of Defense officials
United States Navy admirals
United States Navy personnel of the Gulf War
United States Navy personnel of the Iraq War
United States Navy personnel of the Vietnam War
University of Central Oklahoma alumni